Nine Lives is the twelfth studio album by American rock band Aerosmith, released on March 18, 1997. The album was produced by Aerosmith and Kevin Shirley, and was the band's first studio album released by Columbia Records since 1982's Rock in a Hard Place. In the United States, it peaked at number one on the Billboard 200 and sold over two million copies. One of the album's singles, "Pink", won a Grammy Award for Best Rock Performance by a Duo or Group with Vocal. Until Music from Another Dimension!, Nine Lives was their longest album, at 63 minutes.

Production
Early recordings took place at Criteria Studios in Miami, Florida, where the band worked with producer Glen Ballard. There, Steven Tyler and Ballard co-wrote the lyrics for "Falling in Love (Is Hard on the Knees)", "Taste of India" and "Pink". Other collaborators, including Desmond Child and Taylor Rhodes, joined Tyler and guitarist Joe Perry to write songs. Child previously collaborated with Aerosmith on such hits as "Angel". "Crazy" and "Dude (Looks like a Lady)".

Only a week before rehearsals, drummer Joey Kramer was suffering from depression, having grieved the loss of his father a few years prior. With Kramer unavailable, rumors began to circulate that the band would disband. Steve Ferrone was brought in to play drums until Kramer was able to return. "I came back with a nice perspective on what I bring to the table in Aerosmith," Kramer reflected. "That was healthy for me. We ended up rerecording because people were listening to the tracks and were saying some negative stuff about it and saying the band didn't sound the same."
 
Originally set for a summer release in 1996, the album was delayed, because Columbia Records felt dissatisfied with the nine tracks that Aerosmith and Ballard had produced. Further issues occurred in July that year, when the band asked their manager Tim Collins to step down after almost twelve years of partnership. In his 2014 autobiography Rocks: My Life In and Out of Aerosmith, Perry recounted that Aerosmith felt betrayed by Collins, as he would pit the members against one another. With their longtime manager gone, the band decided to hire in-house producer Kevin Shirley, and set up at Avatar Studios in New York City. Shirley, who had also worked with Journey, helped with the album's overtones and instruments, particularly the guitar sounds. In a 1997 MTV special promoting the making of Nine Lives, Tyler declared: "He's got it somewhere stuck between Toys in the Attic and Rocks."

The new sessions began in September 1996, and continued to November. Following the shift in production, Kramer recovered from his depression, and returned to the studio. Instead of playing his tracks over Ferrone's, the band rerecorded from scratch on all of the completed tracks with Kramer.
John Kalodner, Columbia's A&R executive was brought back to supervise the project, after he had been pushed off the production in Florida by Collins. He helped trim the twenty-four songs that had been written to thirteen. Initially, the band called the album "Vindaloo" after adding in elements of Indian music throughout some of the songs, including a sarangi intro by Ramesh Mishra on the song, "Taste of India". But upon completing the track "Nine Lives", the band felt that would make the perfect title, serving as a metaphor for the album's troubled conception.

Artwork
The booklet for Nine Lives contains 12 pieces of album art (including the cover).  Each picture contains a smaller version of the previous picture within itself. The final picture is included in the first, creating an infinite loop. It was designed by Stefan Sagmeister.

The original cover art, inspired by a painting in a book by A. C. Bhaktivedanta Swami Prabhupada, features Lord Krishna (with a cat's head and female breasts) dancing on the head of the snake demon, Kāliyā. The Hindu community protested, feeling the artwork was offensive. The band had been unaware of the source of the artwork, and the record company apologized, leading to the next prints removing the art from the cover and booklet. The new cover features a cat tied to a circus knife-thrower’s wheel.

Reception

In his AllMusic review, Stephen Thomas Erlewine compared Nine Lives to previous Aerosmith albums stating, “Nine Lives, in contrast, is overlabored, with Aerosmith making a conscious effort to sound hip and vibrant, which ironically simply makes them sound tired." He also criticized the album's troubled production saying, "Not only are the performances perfunctory, but the songs aren't catchy -- no matter how hard it tries, 'Falling in Love (Is Hard on the Knees)' never develops a hook, and it is not an exception". Elysa Gardner from Rolling Stone was more favorable in her 1997 review concluding, "For those who simply can't abide a collection of Aerosmith tunes without its share of power ballads, Nine Lives doesn't disappoint".

Outtakes
Some releases of Nine Lives feature different track listings, most notably the two Japanese editions which both feature the song "Fall Together". The song was included as a B-side on the album's first single "Falling in Love (Is Hard on the Knees)". The track "What Kind of Love Are You On" was originally titled "What Kind of Lover You Want", and was one of many outtakes left from the recording sessions in Florida. The song was re-titled "What Kind of Love Are You On" and features in the 1998 movie Armageddon, as well as its associated soundtrack. The track was later featured on the European re-release of the album's third single "Pink". Unfinished tracks that were discarded during the recording sessions in Florida include, "Bacon Biscuit Blues", "Bridges Are Burning", "Heart of Passion", "Loretta", and "Trouble". Tyler also mentioned a song called "Where the Sun Never Shines" during an MTV interview shortly after the album's release.

Track listing

Personnel
Aerosmith
 Steven Tyler – lead vocals, keyboards, hand organ, piano, harmonica, hammer dulcimer, percussion
 Joe Perry – guitar, slide guitar, dulcimer, backing vocals
 Brad Whitford – guitar, acoustic guitar
 Tom Hamilton – bass guitar, Chapman Stick
 Joey Kramer – drums

Additional personnel
David Campbell – arranger, conductor (track 2)
Ramesh Mishra – sarangi
John Webster – keyboards, backing vocals
Suzie Katayama - strings, conductor

Production
ProducersKevin Shirley and Aerosmith
EngineersMark Hudson, Joe Perry, Rory Romano, Elliot Scheiner, Kevin Shirley, Steven Tyler
Second engineerRory Romano
MixingElliot Scheiner, Kevin Shirley
MasteringLeon Zervos
ProgrammingSander Selover
Horn arrangementsDavid Campbell, Steven Tyler
String arrangementsDavid Campbell
Guitar techniciansJim Survis
Guitar technicians (Additional)Lisa Sharken, Archie Avila
Drum technicianAndy Gilman
Production engineerDavid Frangioni
Art directionChristopher Austopchuk, Gail Marowitz
Photo art directionChristopher Austopchuk, Gail Marowitz
PhotographyF. Scott Schafer
CalligraphyJeanne Greco
StylistFiona Williams-Chappel

Credits verified from the album's liner notes.

Charts

Weekly Charts

Year-end charts

Certifications

Awards
Grammy Awards

References

External links
 Steven Tyler talks about "Where the Sun Never Shines" (Aerosmith outtake) on YouTube

Aerosmith albums
Albums produced by Kevin Shirley
Albums with cover art by Stefan Sagmeister
Columbia Records albums
Hinduism-related controversies
Obscenity controversies in music
1997 albums
Indian mythology in music
Religious controversies in music